The Battle of Morales was fought on 2 June 1813. It was a cavalry skirmish between the Duke of Wellington's vanguard and the rear guard of the French army. It occurred near the village of Morales which is in the vicinity of Toro, Zamora in Spain. General Digeon commanded the French cavalry and Colonel Grant the British hussars, although Major George Robarts was the one who gave the order to charge.

Considered a victory for the British, the French cavalry then retreated upon their own retreating infantry and the British cavalry without infantry support were unable to continue the attack.

Notes

References

1813 in Spain
Morales
Morales
Morales
June 1813 events
History of the province of Zamora